Claude Nollier (born Yvette Emilie Maria Louise Nollier), French actress, was born on 12 December 1919 in Paris, and died 12 February 2009 in Boulogne-Billancourt.

Biography
A theatre actress, she joined the Comédie Française in 1946 to 1951. She began a modest cinematic career during the 1940s. She most notably worked with André Cayatte, John Huston and Sacha Guitry. She is best known for playing the role of Joan of Arc on a number of occasions for the Opéra de Paris, in Jeanne au bûcher, by Paul Claudel and Arthur Honegger.

Selected filmography
Cinema
 1944 : La Vie de plaisir by Albert Valentin
 1946 : Mensonges by Jean Stelli
 1950 : Justice est faite by André Cayatte
 1952 : Le Fruit défendu by Henri Verneuil
 1952 : Moulin Rouge by John Huston
 1954 : Si Versailles m'était conté by Sacha Guitry
 1956 : Si Paris nous était conté by Sacha Guitry
 1957 : Pot-Bouille by Julien Duvivier
 1961 : The Greengage Summer by Lewis Gilbert
 1962 : Le Diable et les dix commandements by Julien Duvivier

Television
 1959 : Les Trois Mousquetaires by Claude Barma

Theatre
 1961 : Andromaque by Racine, directed by Raymond Gérôme, Bellac Festival

References

External links

1919 births
2009 deaths
Actresses from Paris
French stage actresses
French film actresses
French television actresses
Troupe of the Comédie-Française
20th-century French women